Re Yenidje Tobacco Co Ltd [1916] 2 Ch 426 is a UK company law and UK insolvency law case concerning just and equitable winding up.

Facts
Yenidje Tobacco Company Limited had two shareholders with equal shares and each were directors. They could not agree how the company could be managed. There was no provision for breaking the deadlock.

Judgment
The Court of Appeal held the company could be wound up as just and equitable under the Companies (Consolidation) Act 1908 section 129 (now Insolvency Act 1986, section 122(1)(g)) as the only way to break the deadlock. Lord Cozens-Hardy MR said the following.

See also

UK company law

Notes

References

United Kingdom company case law
United Kingdom insolvency case law
1916 in British law
1916 in case law
Court of Appeal (England and Wales) cases